The Women's 200 Butterfly event at the 11th FINA World Aquatics Championships swam 27 – 28 July 2005 in Montreal, Canada. Preliminary and Semifinal heats were on 27 July; the Final was held 28 July.

At the start of the event, the existing World (WR) and Championships (CR) records were:
WR: 2:05.78 swum by Otylia Jędrzejczak (Poland) on 4 August 2002 in Berlin, Germany
CR: 2:06.73 swum by Petria Thomas (Australia) on 23 July 2001 in Fukuoka, Japan

Results

Final

Semifinals

Preliminaries

References

Swimming at the 2005 World Aquatics Championships
2005 in women's swimming